That Swing Thing! is an album recorded by American jazz vibraphonist and bandleader Terry Gibbs featuring performances recorded in 1961 in California and released on the Verve label.

Reception

AllMusic stated "Vibraphonist Terry Gibbs has so much energy that even the ballads on this obscure Verve LP seem hyper ... Fun music".

Track listing
All compositions by Terry Gibbs except where noted
 "Let My People Blow" – 6:43
 "Moanin'" (Bobby Timmons) – 8:00
 "Stella by Starlight" (Victor Young, Ned Washington) – 6:07
 "Three Blind Mice" – 5:20
 "Blue Wednesday" – 5:22
 "Mannehole March" – 6:54

Personnel
Terry Gibbs – vibraphone
Pat Moran – piano
Jimmy Bond – bass
Gary Frommer – drums

References

Terry Gibbs albums
1962 live albums
Verve Records live albums
Albums recorded at Shelly's Manne-Hole